Lucia Focque (born 30 March 1964) is a Belgian rower. She competed in the women's quadruple sculls event at the 1988 Summer Olympics.

References

External links
 

1964 births
Living people
Belgian female rowers
Olympic rowers of Belgium
Rowers at the 1988 Summer Olympics
People from Willebroek
Sportspeople from Antwerp Province
20th-century Belgian women